Galit Baram (born 1969, Jerusalem, has been the Israeli Consul General in Toronto since August 2016.

Baram, whose parents were a physician and a teacher who attended Hebrew University, earned a bachelor's degree in Archeology and English from Tel Aviv University (1991-1994) and a master's degree in American Studies from the Hebrew University of Jerusalem (2003-2006). She is married to Nissan Amdur who is also an Israeli diplomat.

References

Israeli consuls
Israeli women diplomats
Hebrew University of Jerusalem alumni
Tel Aviv University alumni
1969 births
Living people